Bold is an EP by American singer-songwriter Mary Lambert. The record is a follow-up to her album, Heart on My Sleeve (2014). The lead single from the EP is "Hang out with You", which was released on July 8, 2016. Lambert offered the EP as part of a Kickstarter campaign. The EP was commercially released on May 5, 2017.

Track listing

References

2017 EPs